KQR may refer to:

 Karara Airport (IATA airport code: KQR), Karara, Western Australia, Australia
 Koderma Junction railway station (station code KQR), Jhumri Telaiya, Koderma, Jharkhand, India
 Momogun language (ISO 639 language code: kqr)

See also